Hoplostethus mikhailini is a deepwater species of the family Trachichthyidae. It can reach sizes of up to  SL.

References

External links
 

mikhailini
Fish described in 1986
Fish of the Atlantic Ocean
Fish of the Indian Ocean